Kamaka Qapqan Hepa (born January 27, 2000) is an American college basketball player for the Hawaii Rainbow Warriors of the Big West Conference (BWC). He previously played for the Texas Longhorns.

Early life and high school career
Hepa was born and brought up in Utqiagvik, Alaska (formerly known as Barrow), the northernmost community in the United States. He grew up playing club basketball for the Alaska Mountaineers, with whom he won tournaments in North Carolina and California. As a freshman and sophomore, Hepa played for Barrow High School. In each season, he led his team to the Class 3A state title and was named Alaska Gatorade Player of the Year.

In March 2016, Hepa moved to Portland, Oregon to gain more exposure and to play for Portland Basketball Club on the Amateur Athletic Union circuit. He also enrolled at Jefferson High School, where he played under head coach Pat Strickland. As a junior, Hepa averaged 16.4 points and 11.3 rebounds per game, leading Jefferson to its first Class 6A state title. In his senior season, he led his team to a Class 6A runner-up finish. After averaging 16.5 points, 10.4 rebounds and 6.2 blocks per game, he was named Oregon Gatorade Player of the Year. On October 31, 2017, Hepa committed to playing college basketball for Texas as a four-star recruit.

College career
In February 2019, as a freshman, Hepa suffered a head injury in practice and missed two games in concussion protocol. On February 27, 2019, in his first career start, he scored a freshman season-high 11 points in an 84–83 loss to Baylor. He finished the season averaging 1.9 points and 1.6 rebounds in 10.3 minutes per game. On January 15, 2020, in his sophomore season, Hepa scored a career-high 15 points and four rebounds in a 76–64 win over Oklahoma State. As a sophomore, he averaged 2.9 points and two rebounds in 13.5 minutes per game. In his junior season, he played nine games and averaged 2.9 points in 6.4 minutes per game.

In 2021, Hepa was named an Arthur Ashe Jr. Sports Scholar by Diverse: Issues In Higher Education. 

On April 25, 2021, Hepa announced that he would transfer to Hawaii. In 27 games, Hepa averaged 9.4 points in 28.1 minutes per game.

National team career
Hepa represented the United States at the 2018 FIBA Under-18 Americas Championship in St. Catharines, Ontario. He averaged 3.3 points and five rebounds per game, winning a gold medal.

Career statistics

College

|-
| style="text-align:left;"| 2018–19
| style="text-align:left;"| Texas
| 27 || 1 || 10.3 || .291 || .310 || .857 || 1.6 || .3 || .0 || .3 || 1.9
|-
| style="text-align:left;"| 2019–20
| style="text-align:left;"| Texas
| 22 || 10 || 13.5 || .361 || .292 || .667 || 2.0 || .6 || .2 || .6 || 2.9
|-
| style="text-align:left;"| 2020–21
| style="text-align:left;"| Texas
| 9 || 1 || 6.4 || .500 || .500 || .000 || 1.0 || .1 || .1 || .2 || 2.9
|- class="sortbottom"
| style="text-align:center;" colspan="2"| Career
|| 58 || 12 || 10.9 || .351 || .330 || .706 || 1.6 || .4 || .1 || .4 || 2.4

Personal life
Hepa's father, Roland Hepa, is originally from Kapa'a, Hawaii and is of Hawaiian and Filipino descent. Hepa's mother, Taqulik (née Opie), is an Iñupiaq from Utqiagvik.  His mother played basketball for Barrow High School, while his father was a multi-sport athlete in high school.

Hepa's older sister, Lynette, was a standout basketball player for Barrow High School before playing collegiately at Fort Lewis College. On November 23, 2015, his half-brother, Radford Kawika Hepa, was shot and killed in Anchorage, Alaska. Kamaka’s younger brother, Keoni, is a collegiate football player at Simon Fraser.

References

External links
Hawaii Rainbow Warriors bio
Texas Longhorns bio
USA Basketball bio

2000 births
Living people
American men's basketball players
Texas Longhorns men's basketball players
American people of Ilocano descent
Small forwards
Power forwards (basketball)
People from Utqiagvik, Alaska
Basketball players from Alaska
Inupiat people
American sportspeople of Filipino descent